Leonard Green & Partners ("LGP") is an American private equity investment firm founded in 1989 and based in Los Angeles. The firm specializes in private equity investments. LGP has invested in over 95 companies since its inception, including Petco and The Container Store.

History

Leonard Green was founded by Leonard I. Green in 1989 after separating from Gibbons, Green and van Amerongen Ltd. (Gibbons Green), a bank which he had co-founded in 1969 with Edward Gibbons and Lewis van Amerongen. Leonard Green died in 2002, leaving the firm to be run by John G. Danhakl, Peter J. Nolan and Jonathan D. Sokoloff.

The firm's predecessor, Gibbons Green was among the earliest practitioners of the leveraged buyout and management buyout. Gibbons Green purchased several companies, including Purex Industries in 1982, Budget Rent a Car from Transamerica in 1986 and Kash n' Karry Food Stores in 1988. The company planned to purchase Argonaut Group Inc in 1987, but withdrew from the buyout.

The dissolution of Gibbons Green and the formation of Leonard Green & Partners is attributed by some to the failure of two buyouts: Ohio Mattress Company and Sheller-Globe Corporation.

In 2019, LGP named John Baumer and Evan Hershberg co-heads of the Jade Fund.

In March 2020, partners at LGP committed to plans for a $10 million employee-assistance fund for employees of Leonard Green portfolio companies impacted by the COVID-19 pandemic.

Notable Investments
In 1996, LGP sold its stake of Thrifty Payless to Rite Aid Corporation.

Between 1997 and 2008, LGP made several acquisitions, including Leslie's Poolmart and Petco.

In 2016, LGP closed Green Equity Investors VII, L.P. (“GEI VII”), with $9.6 billion of committed capital. In 2019, LGP raised $14.75 billion for two new funds.

Between 2009 and 2018, LGP's acquisitions included The Container Store and Jo-Ann Stores, and The Shade Store, among others. In 2012, LGP invested in Shake Shack.

In July 2020, LGP, alongside TPG Capital, invested in WellSky, a health and community care technology company. In November 2020, LGP acquired Service Logic from Warburg Pincus.

In February 2021, ProPublica reported on a dispute between LGP and Rhode Islands regulators and legislators over LGP's divestment in Prospect Medical Holdings.

References

External links

1989 establishments in California
American companies established in 1989
Companies based in Los Angeles
Conglomerate companies of the United States
Drexel Burnham Lambert
Financial services companies based in California
Financial services companies established in 1989
Financial services companies of the United States
Private equity firms of the United States